15th ADG Awards
February 5, 2011

Period Film:
The King's Speech

Fantasy Film:
Inception

Contemporary Film:
Black Swan

The 15th Art Directors Guild Awards, which were given on February 5, 2011, honored the best production designers of 2010.

Winners and nominees

Film
Period Film:
Eve Stewart – The King's Speech
Geoffrey Kirkland – Get Low
Arthur Max – Robin Hood
Dante Ferretti – Shutter Island
Jess Gonchor – True Grit

Fantasy Film:
Guy Hendrix Dyas – Inception
Robert Stromberg – Alice in Wonderland
Barry Robison – The Chronicles of Narnia: The Voyage of the Dawn Treader
Stuart Craig – Harry Potter and the Deathly Hallows – Part 1
Darren Gilford – Tron: Legacy

Contemporary Film:
Thérèse DePrez – Black Swan
Suttirat Larlarb – 127 Hours
Judy Becker – The Fighter
Donald Graham Burt – The Social Network
Sharon Seymour – The Town

Television
Single-Camera Series:
Dan Bishop – Mad Men (for "Public Relations")
Carlos Barbosa – 24 (for "4:00 p.m. – 5:00 p.m.")
Mark Hutman – Glee (for "Britney/Brittany")
Suzuki Ingerslev – True Blood (for "Trouble")
Tom Conroy – The Tudors (for "#407")

Multi-Camera Unscripted Series:
Keith Raywood, Eugene Lee, Akira Yoshimura, and N. Joseph DeTullio – Saturday Night Live (for "Host: Betty White/Jay-Z")
John Shaffner and Joe Stewart – Conan (for "#1.1")
Stephan G. Olson – How I Met Your Mother (for "Natural History")
John Shaffner – Two and a Half Men (for "Hookers, Hookers, Hookers")

Miniseries or Television Movie:
Robb Wilson King – Secrets in the Walls
Marcia Hinds – Revenge of the Bridesmaids

External links
The winners and nominees on the official website

2010 film awards
2010 guild awards
Art Directors Guild Awards
2011 in American cinema